Marko Mesić (1640? in Brinje – 2 February 1713 in Karlobag) was a Croatian priest and war hero from the Ottoman wars. Under his command, Croats and Serbs liberated the region of Lika in the 17th century.

Biography

In 1683 when Austro-Turkish war begun, Marko Mesić went to Ravni Kotari where he joined the local rebels against the Turks. Soon afterwards he goes to Krbava and Lika and organizes uprising against the Turks from Brinje. On 15 June 1689 he captured Novi and a number of other villages who surrendered without a fight. Finally, Udbina was liberated on 21 July 1689.

References

1640 births
1713 deaths
People from Brinje
17th-century Croatian Roman Catholic priests
Croatian soldiers
18th-century Croatian Roman Catholic priests
17th-century Croatian military personnel